The  is a national expressway in Mie Prefecture, Japan. It is owned and operated by Central Nippon Expressway Company.

Overview

Officially, the route is designated as the Kinki Expressway Ise Route, however this designation does not appear on any signage.

The expressway runs from north to south through central Mie Prefecture, beginning at a junction with the Meihan National Highway. It passes to the west of the cities of Tsu and Matsusaka before coming to a junction with the Kisei Expressway. Here the Ise Expressway turns east and eventually terminates in the city of Ise. From the terminus the Ise Futami Toba Toll Road continues east on the same roadway.

The first section was opened to traffic in 1975. Direct access to the Higashi-Meihan Expressway was established in 2005. Prior to the completion of this junction users could only travel between the two expressways via the Meihan Highway.

The exit numbering system is continuous with the Higashi-Meihan. The entire route is 4 lanes with the exception of the short (1.8 km) section between Ise-nishi Interchange and Ise Interchange.

List of interchanges and features

 IC - interchange, JCT - junction, PA - parking area, SA - service area, TB - toll gate, TN - tunnel, BR - bridge

References

External links
Central Nippon Expressway Company 

Expressways in Japan
Roads in Mie Prefecture